The Chaplin–Clarke House is a historic First Period house at 109 Haverhill Street in Rowley, Massachusetts.  Its oldest section built c. 1670 by Joseph Chaplin, it is the oldest house in Rowley.  The house began as a full width two story wood-frame structure that was only one room deep; the leanto section at the rear was added c. 1700.  The house was acquired in the early 1700s by Richard Clarke, in whose family it remained until the early 20th century.  It was owned for a time by the Society for the Preservation of New England Antiquities (now called Historic New England), but is now in private hands.

The house was listed on the National Register of Historic Places in 1979.

See also
List of the oldest buildings in Massachusetts
National Register of Historic Places listings in Essex County, Massachusetts

References

Houses completed in 1670
Houses in Rowley, Massachusetts
Houses on the National Register of Historic Places in Essex County, Massachusetts
1670 establishments in Massachusetts